Georgios Chatzizisis (born 4 June 1978) is a Greek former professional footballer who played as a right-back.

External links
 
Profile at epae.org

1978 births
Living people
Greek footballers
PAOK FC players
Kavala F.C. players
Apollon Smyrnis F.C. players
Apollon Pontou FC players
Olympiacos Volos F.C. players
Pierikos F.C. players
Association football fullbacks
Greece international footballers
People from Kozani (regional unit)
Footballers from Western Macedonia